Peter Ernst Wilde ( – ) was a Baltic German physician and Enlightenment era Estophile.

He is noted for establishing a printing house at Kuningamäe, Põltsamaa, Estonia, and printing the first Estonian periodical, Lühhike öppetus, there in 1766–1767.  In 1771, he supplied material for Arsti ramat, the first Estonian medical manual. He lived in America for a short period.

Wilde was born in  Woedtke, near Treptow an der Rega, and died, aged 53, in Põltsamaa

References

 EEVA entry:  Peter Ernst Wilde ( * 24.08.1732 - † 28.12.1785 ) - Valgustuslik kirjamees; estofiil; arst
Bartlett, Roger. (April 1, 2006) The Slavonic and East European Review. German popular enlightenment in the Russian empire: Peter Ernst Wilde and Catherine II. Volume 84; Issue 2; Page 256.

1732 births
1785 deaths
People from Gryfice
People from the Province of Pomerania
Baltic-German people
18th-century German physicians
German journalists
German male journalists
Estonian journalists
Estophiles
18th-century Estonian people
18th-century German male writers